The women's heptathlon event at the 2022 African Championships in Athletics was held on 8 and 9 August in Port Louis, Mauritius.

Medalists

Results

100 metres hurdles
Wind: +0.4 m/s

High jump

Shot put

200 metres
Wind: -0.2 m/s

Long jump

Javelin throw

800 metres

Final standings

References

2022 African Championships in Athletics
Combined events at the African Championships in Athletics